The Aoghairean of the Hebrides, Scotland, according to Thomas Pennant, were farm servants who had the charge of cultivating a certain portion of land, and of overseeing the cattle it supported. They had grass for two milch cows and six sheep, and also had one tenth sheaf of the produce of the said ground, and as many potatoes as they chose to plant.

The term is plural; its singular form would be aoghair.

References
  (Aoghairean)

See also
 Half-foot
 Crofting
 Davoch
 Quarterland

Agriculture in Scotland
Land tenure